Caltech Intermediate Form (CIF) is a file format for describing integrated circuits.
CIF provides a limited set of graphics primitives that are useful for describing the two-dimensional
shapes on the different layers of a chip.
The format allows hierarchical description, which makes the representation concise.
In addition, it is a terse but human-readable text format.

Overview 

Each statement in CIF consists of a keyword or letter followed by parameters and terminated
with a semicolon.
Spaces must separate the parameters but there are no restrictions on the number of statements
per line or of the particular columns of any field.
Comments can be inserted anywhere by enclosing them in parentheses. 

There are only a few CIF statements and they fall into one of two categories: geometry or control.
The geometry statements are: LAYER to switch mask layers, BOX to draw a
rectangle, WIRE to draw a path, ROUNDFLASH to draw a circle, POLYGON to draw an arbitrary
figure, and CALL to draw a subroutine of other geometry statements.
The control statements are DS to start the definition of a subroutine, DF to finish the
definition of a subroutine, DD to delete the definition of subroutines, 0 through 9 to
include additional user-specified information, and END to terminate a CIF file.
All of these keywords are usually abbreviated to one or two letters that are unique.

Geometry 

The LAYER statement (or the letter L) sets the mask layer to be used
for all subsequent geometry until the next such statement.
Following the LAYER keyword comes a single layer-name parameter.
For example, the command: 
    L CC;
sets the layer to be the CMOS contact cut (see Fig. B.1 for some typical MOS layer names).

The BOX statement (or the letter B) is the most commonly used way of
specifying geometry.
It describes a rectangle by giving its length, width, center position, and an optional rotation.
The format is as follows: 
    B length width xpos ypos [rotation] ;
Without the rotation field, the four numbers specify a box the center of which is
at (xpos, ypos) and is length across in x and width tall in y.
All numbers in CIF are integers that refer to centimicrons of distance, unless subroutine
scaling is specified (described later).
The optional rotation field contains two numbers that define a vector endpoint
starting at the origin.
The default value of this field is (1, 0), which is a right-pointing vector.
Thus the rotation clause 10 5 defines a 26.6-degree counterclockwise rotation from the normal.
Similarly, 10 -10 will rotate clockwise by 45 degrees.
Note that the magnitude of this rotation vector has no meaning.

The WIRE statement (or the letter W) is used to construct a
path that runs between a set of points.
The path can have a nonzero width and has rounded corners.
After the WIRE keyword comes the width value and then an arbitrary
number of coordinate pairs that describe the endpoints.
Figure B.2 shows a sample wire.
Note that the endpoint and corner rounding are implicitly handled.

The ROUNDFLASH statement (or the letter R) draws a filled
circle, given the diameter and the center coordinate. For example, the statement: 
    R 20 30 40;
will draw a circle that has a radius of 10 (diameter of 20), centered at (30, 40).

The POLYGON statement (or the letter P) takes a series of
coordinate pairs and draws a filled polygon from them.
Since filled polygons must be closed, the first and last coordinate points are
implicitly connected and need not be the same.
Polygons can be arbitrarily complex, including concavity and self-intersection.
Figure B.3 illustrates a polygon statement.

Hierarchy 

The CALL statement (or the letter C) invokes a collection
of other statements that have been packaged with DS and DF.
All subroutines are given numbers when they are defined and these numbers are used in
the CALL to identify them.
If, for example, a LAYER statement and a BOX statement are
packaged into subroutine 4, then the statement:
    C 4;
will cause the box to be drawn on that layer. 

In addition to simply invoking the subroutine, a CALL statement can include
transformations to affect the geometry inside the subroutine.
Three transformations can be applied to a subroutine in CIF: translation, rotation, and mirroring.
Translation is specified as the letter T followed by an x, y offset.
These offsets will be added to all coordinates in the subroutine, to translate its
graphics across the mask.
Rotation is specified as the letter R followed by an x, y vector endpoint
that, much like the rotation clause in the BOX statement, defines a line to the origin.
The unrotated line has the endpoint (1, 0), which points to the right.
Mirroring is available in two forms: MX to mirror in x and MY to mirror in y.
Mirroring is a bit confusing, because MX causes a negation of the x
coordinate, which effectively mirrors about the y axis.

Any number of transformations can be applied to an object and their listed order
is the sequence that will be used to apply them.
Figure B.4 shows some examples, illustrating the importance of ordering the
transformations (notice that Figs. B.4c and B.4d produce different results by
rearranging the transformations).

Defining subroutines for use in a CALL statement is quite simple.
The statements to be packaged are enclosed between DS (definition
start) and DF (definition finish) statements.
Arguments to the DS statement are the subroutine number and a subroutine scaling factor.
There are no arguments to the DF statement.
The scaling factor for a subroutine consists of a numerator followed by a denominator
that will be applied to all values inside the subroutine.
This scaling allows large numbers to be expressed with fewer digits and allows ease
of rescaling a design.
The scale factor cannot be changed for each invocation of the subroutine since it
is applied to the definition.
As an example, the subroutine of Fig. B.4 can be described formally as follows:
    DS 10 20 2;
      B10 20 5 5;
      W1 5 5 10 15;
    DF;
Note that the scale factor is 20/2, which allows the trailing zero to be dropped
from all values inside the subroutine. 

Arbitrary depth of hierarchy is allowed in CIF subroutines.
Forward references are allowed provided that a subroutine is defined before it is used.
Thus the sequence:
    DS 10;
       ...
      C 11;
    DF;
    DS 11;
       ...
    DF;
    C 10;
is legal, but the sequence:
    C 11;
    DS 11;
       ...

    DF;
is not. This is because the actual invocation of subroutine 11 does
not occur until after its definition in the first example.

Control 

CIF subroutines can be overwritten by deleting them and then redefining them.
The DD statement (delete definition) takes a single parameter and
deletes every subroutine that has a number greater than or equal to this value.
The statement is useful when merging multiple CIF files because designs can be
defined, invoked, and deleted without causing naming conflicts.
However, it is not recommended for general use by CAD systems.

Extensions to CIF can be done with the numeric statements 0 through 9.
Although not officially part of CIF, certain conventions have evolved for the
use of these extensions (see Fig. B.5).

The final statement in a CIF file is the END statement (or the letter E).
It takes no parameters and typically does not include a semicolon.

BNF grammar
The following is the grammar for the CIF format with cifFile being the top level grammar node.

 cifFile ::= (blank* command? semi)* endCommand blank*
 command ::= primCommand | defDeleteCommand | defStartCommand semi (blank* primCommand? semi)* defFinishCommand
 primCommand ::= polygonCommand | boxCommand | roundFlashCommand | wireCommand | layerCommand | callCommand | userExtensionCommand | commentCommand
 polygonCommand ::= "P" path
 boxCommand ::= "B" integer sep integer sep point (sep point)?
 roundFlashCommand ::= "R" integer sep point
 wireCommand ::= "W" integer sep path
 layerCommand ::= "L" blank* shortname
 defStartCommand ::= "D" blank* "S" integer (sep integer sep integer)?
 defFinishCommand ::= "D" blank* "F"
 defDeleteCommand ::= "D" blank* "D" integer
 callCommand ::= "C" integer transformation
 userExtensionCommand ::= digit userText
 commentCommand ::= "(" commentText ")"
 endCommand ::= "E"
 transformation ::= (blank* ("T" point |"M" blank* "X" |"M" blank* "Y" |"R" point)*)*
 path ::= point (sep point)*
 point ::= sInteger sep sInteger
 sInteger ::= sep* "-"? integerD
 integer ::= sep* integerD
 integerD ::= digit+
 shortname ::= c c? c? c?
 c ::= digit | upperChar
 userText ::= userChar*
 commentText ::= commentChar* | commentText "(" commentText ")" commentText
 semi ::= blank* ";" blank*
 sep ::= upperChar | blank
 digit ::= "0" | "1" | ... | "9"
 upperChar ::= "A" | "B" | ... | "Z"
 blank ::= any ASCII character except digit, upperChar, "-", "(", ")", or ";"
 userChar ::= any ASCII character except ";"
 commentChar ::= any ASCII character except "(" or ")"

See also
GDS II stream format
OASIS (Open Artwork System Interchange Standard)
EDIF, a vendor neutral file format made in 90s

References 
Computer Aids for VLSI Design - Appendix B: Caltech Intermediate Format by Steven M. Rubin
Hon, Robert W. and Sequin, Carlo H., "A Guide to LSI Implementation," 2nd Edition, Xerox Palo Alto Research Center technical memo SSL-79-7, January 1980.

EDA file formats